Tanha Kola may refer to:
 Tanha Kola, Amol
 Tanha Kola, Babol